In mathematical physics, n-dimensional de Sitter space (often abbreviated to dSn) is a maximally symmetric Lorentzian manifold with constant positive scalar curvature. It is the Lorentzian analogue of an n-sphere (with its canonical Riemannian metric).

The main application of de Sitter space is its use in general relativity,  where it serves as one of the simplest mathematical models of the universe consistent with the observed accelerating expansion of the universe. More specifically, de Sitter space is the maximally symmetric vacuum solution of Einstein's field equations with a positive cosmological constant  (corresponding to a positive vacuum energy density and negative pressure). There is cosmological evidence that the universe itself is asymptotically de Sitter, i.e. it will evolve like the de Sitter universe in the far future when dark energy dominates.

de Sitter space and anti-de Sitter space are named after Willem de Sitter (1872–1934), professor of astronomy at Leiden University and director of the Leiden Observatory. Willem de Sitter and Albert Einstein worked closely together in Leiden in the 1920s on the spacetime structure of our universe. de Sitter space was also discovered, independently, and about the same time, by Tullio Levi-Civita.

Definition
de Sitter space can be defined as a submanifold of a generalized Minkowski space of one higher dimension. Take Minkowski space R1,n with the standard metric:

de Sitter space is the submanifold described by the hyperboloid of one sheet

where  is some nonzero constant with its dimension being that of length. The metric on de Sitter space is the metric induced from the ambient Minkowski metric. The induced metric is nondegenerate and has Lorentzian signature. The induced metric in this case is positive-definite, and each sheet is a copy of hyperbolic n-space. For a detailed proof, see .)

de Sitter space can also be defined as the quotient  of two indefinite orthogonal groups, which shows that it is a non-Riemannian symmetric space.

Properties
The isometry group of de Sitter space is the Lorentz group . The metric therefore then has  independent Killing vector fields and is maximally symmetric. Every maximally symmetric space has constant curvature. The Riemann curvature tensor of de Sitter is given by

(using the sign convention  for the Riemann curvature tensor). de Sitter space is an Einstein manifold since the Ricci tensor is proportional to the metric:

This means de Sitter space is a vacuum solution of Einstein's equation with cosmological constant given by

The scalar curvature of de Sitter space is given by

Coordinates

Static coordinates 
We can introduce static coordinates  for de Sitter as follows:

where  gives the standard embedding the -sphere in Rn−1. In these coordinates the de Sitter metric takes the form:

Flat slicing 
Let

where .  Then in the  coordinates metric reads:

where  is the flat metric on 's.

Setting , we obtain the conformally flat metric:

Open slicing 
Let

Then the metric of the de Sitter space reads

where

is the standard hyperbolic metric.

Closed slicing 
Let

Then the metric reads:

Changing the time variable to the conformal time via  we obtain a metric conformally equivalent to Einstein static universe:

These coordinates, also known as "global coordinates" cover the maximal extension of de Sitter space, and can therefore be used to find its Penrose diagram.

dS slicing 
Let

Then the metric reads:

where

is the metric of an  dimensional de Sitter space with radius of curvature  in open slicing coordinates.  The hyperbolic metric is given by:

This is the analytic continuation of the open slicing coordinates under  and also switching  and  because they change their timelike/spacelike nature.

See also
 Anti-de Sitter space
 de Sitter universe
 AdS/CFT correspondence
 de Sitter–Schwarzschild metric

References

Further reading

External links
  Simplified Guide to de Sitter and anti-de Sitter Spaces A pedagogic introduction to de Sitter and anti-de Sitter spaces. The main article is simplified, with almost no math. The appendix is technical and intended for readers with physics or math backgrounds.

Exact solutions in general relativity
Differential geometry
Minkowski spacetime